Baron Strathcarron, of Banchor in the County of Inverness, is a title in the Peerage of the United Kingdom. It was created on 11 January 1936 for the Liberal politician Sir Ian Macpherson, 1st Baronet. He had already been created a baronet, of Drumalban on 26 April 1933. , the titles are held by his grandson, the third Baron, who succeeded his father in 2006.

Niall Macpherson, 1st Baron Drumalbyn, was the nephew of the first Baron Strathcarron.

Barons Strathcarron (1936)
(James) Ian Macpherson, 1st Baron Strathcarron (1880–1937)
David William Anthony Blyth Macpherson, 2nd Baron Strathcarron (1924–2006)
Ian David Patrick Macpherson, 3rd Baron Strathcarron (b. 1949)

The heir apparent is the present holder's son, the Hon. Rory David Alisdair Macpherson (b. 1982).
The heir apparent’s heir apparent is his son, Otto Macpherson (b. 2017)

Notes

References
Kidd, Charles, Williamson, David (editors). Debrett's Peerage and Baronetage (1990 edition). New York: St Martin's Press, 1990, 

Baronies in the Peerage of the United Kingdom
Noble titles created in 1936
Noble titles created for UK MPs